The 4th National Congress of the Lao People's Revolutionary Party (LPRP) was held in Vientiane on 13–15 November 1986. The congress occurs once every five years. A total of 300 delegates represented the party's nearly 45,000 card-carrying members.

References

Congresses of the Lao People's Revolutionary Party
1986 in Laos
1986 conferences